The 2015–16 Newcastle Jets FC season was the club's 15th season since its establishment in 2000. The club participated in the A-League for the 11th time and the FFA Cup for the second time.

Players

Squad information

From youth squad

Transfers in

Transfers out

Technical staff

Statistics

Squad statistics

|-
|colspan="19"|Players no longer at the club:

Pre-season and friendlies

Competitions

Overall

A-League

League table

Results summary

Results by round

Matches

FFA Cup

References

External links
 Official Website

Newcastle Jets
Newcastle Jets FC seasons